Michael Charles Brisky (born May 28, 1965) is an American professional golfer who played on the PGA Tour and the Nationwide Tour.

Brisky attended Pan American University (now called the University of Texas Rio Grande Valley) where he was a standout member of the men's golf team from 1982 through 1986. He was inducted into the University's Athletic Hall of Fame in 2012.

Brisky joined the PGA Tour in 1994, earning his Tour card through qualifying school. He didn't play well enough to retain his Tour card but earned his card for the following year through qualifying school. He also played on the Nationwide Tour that year and won the Nike Texarkana Open. He did a lot better on the PGA Tour in 1995 and finished 92nd on the money list. The highlight of his year came at the Buick Open where he lost in a playoff to Woody Austin. He continued to play well in 1996 and finished 84th on the money list while recording three top-10 finishes. He also finished in a tie for 14th at the 1996 PGA Championship. He played even better in 1997, finishing 67th on the money list while recording six top-10 finishes including a third-place finish at the Deposit Guaranty Golf Classic. He didn't play as well in 1998, recording only one top-10 finish. He had to go through qualifying school to earn his card for the following year. In 1999 he finished 115th on the money list with the highlight of his year coming at the John Deere Classic where he lost to J. L. Lewis in a playoff. 2000 was his last year on the PGA Tour and he didn't find much success. He played on the Nationwide Tour from 2001 to 2003.

Brisky played on the NGA Hooters Tour from 1989 to 1993 where he won two tournaments

Professional wins (3)

Nike Tour wins (1)

Other wins (2)
2 wins on the Hooters Tour

Playoff record
PGA Tour playoff record (0–2)

Results in major championships

CUT = missed the half-way cut
"T" = tied
Note: Brisky never played in the Masters Tournament or The Open Championship.

See also
1993 PGA Tour Qualifying School graduates
1994 PGA Tour Qualifying School graduates
1998 PGA Tour Qualifying School graduates

References

External links

American male golfers
PGA Tour golfers
Golfers from Texas
University of Texas–Pan American alumni
People from Southlake, Texas
1965 births
Living people